Group B of the 2016 Fed Cup Americas Zone Group II was one of two pools in the Americas zone of the 2016 Fed Cup. Four teams competed in a round robin competition, with the top two teams proceeding to the play-offs where they played for promotion to Group I.

Standings

Round-robin

Dominican Republic vs. Uruguay

Guatemala vs. Bahamas

Dominican Republic vs. Bahamas

Puerto Rico vs. Guatemala

Dominican Republic vs. Guatemala

Puerto Rico vs. Uruguay

Guatemala vs. Uruguay

Puerto Rico vs. Bahamas

Puerto Rico vs. Dominican Republic

Bahamas vs. Uruguay

References

External links 
 Fed Cup website

2016 Fed Cup Americas Zone